Louis Gomis (born 3 December 1974) is a Senegalese former professional footballer. Most notably he played in the Bundesliga for 1. FC Nürnberg.

Honors
1. FC Nürnberg
 2. Bundesliga: 2000–01

Club Sportif Sfaxien
 CAF Cup: 1998

References

External links
 

Living people
1974 births
Association football forwards
Senegalese footballers
Senegalese expatriate footballers
Senegal international footballers
CS Sfaxien players
Étoile Sportive du Sahel players
1. FC Nürnberg players
MSV Duisburg players
K.F.C. Lommel S.K. players
R.A.E.C. Mons players
Apollon Limassol FC players
Angers SCO players
Berliner AK 07 players
Bundesliga players
2. Bundesliga players
Belgian Pro League players
Cypriot First Division players
Ligue 2 players
Expatriate footballers in Tunisia
Expatriate footballers in Belgium
Expatriate footballers in Germany
Expatriate footballers in France
Expatriate footballers in Cyprus